The siege of Perekop, also known as the Perekop-Chongar Operation, was the final battle of the Southern Front in the Russian Civil War from 7 to 17 November 1920. The White movement's stronghold on the Crimean Peninsula was protected by the Chongar fortification system along the strategic Isthmus of Perekop and the Syvash, from which the Crimean Corps under General Yakov Slashchov repelled several Red Army invasion attempts in early 1920. The Southern Front of the Red Army and the Revolutionary Insurgent Army of Ukraine, under the command of Mikhail Frunze, launched an offensive on Crimea with an invasion force four-times larger than the defenders, the Russian Army under the command of General Pyotr Wrangel. Despite suffering heavy losses, the Reds broke through the fortifications, and the Whites were forced into retreat southwards. Following their defeat at the siege of Perekop, the Whites evacuated from the Crimea, dissolving the Army of Wrangel and ending the Southern Front in Bolshevik victory.

About 50 years later, students from Moscow created a monument of remembrance for the battle.

Fortifications
The construction of fortifications on the Isthmus of Perekop began in the autumn of 1919. The Russian Army defense system consisted of two lines: Perekop (its basis was the section of the Turkish Wall with a total length of 11 km, it included an old Tatar ditch up to 10 meters deep and wide, wire fences in 3-5 rows and three lines of trenches) and Yushun (20–25 km south of the first line, from several lines of trenches covered with barbed wire).

There were also fortifications to strengthen the Chongar Peninsular and the Arabat Spit - up to 5-6 lines of trenches and trenches with barbed wire. The Lithuanian Peninsula was the only place that had relatively weakly defenses, with only one line of trenches and barbed wire.

Approximately 10,000 Russian Army soldiers defended Perekop and Yushun, while 3,000 defended the Syvash, the Chongar Strait and the Arabat Spit. Over 14,000 reserves were also located in the rear of Yushun.

Planning
Initially, Mikhail Frunze had planned to deliver the main blow toward Chongar but due to the ice holding the Azov Flotilla back in Taganrog, the main attack was transferred on toward Perekop. The assault on Perekop was executed by the 6th Army, 1st Cavalry Army and 2nd Cavalry Army. Just before the operation began, 8,000 members of the Communist Party and 2,500 members of the Young Communist League arrived as reinforcements to the Red Army.

The attack by units of the 1st Cavalry Army from Henichesk, through the Arabat Spit to Feodosia, was suppressed by the fire of Wrangel's fleet, part of which approached Henichesk, so it was decided to conduct an auxiliary strike on Chongar and Arabat (by the forces of the 4th Army and the 3rd Cavalry Corps).

Battle

Deployment and crossing the Syvash

The Reds began the operation to capture Crimea on 3 November 1920, with another unsuccessful frontal attack on the Perekop fortifications.

Therefore, it was decided to bypass Perekop along the Syvash. On 5 November, the wind caught water in the Syvash and it was decided to wait for it to get shallower. And on the night of 8 November 1920, the shock group of the 6th Army (the 15th, 51st and 52nd divisions, a cavalry group, in total about 20,000 bayonets and sabers with 36 artillery cannons), crossed the 7-kilometer water obstacle in adverse weather conditions (strong winds and minus 11-12 degrees Celsius). And on the afternoon of 8 November, the Reds, with overwhelming numerical superiority, successfully broke the defense of General Mikhail Fostikov's brigade, which was defending the Kuban peninsula, numbering only 1,500 bayonets with 12 artillery cannons. The Red Army soldiers captured the Lithuanian Peninsula and began to move to the rear of the White positions at Perekop.

Assault on the Turkish Wall
In order to concentrate the attacking forces, the division was reorganized into six waves: the first was made up of grenade launchers and wire cutters, the second - attack aircraft; the third was a reserve; the fourth - "cleaners", and the fifth and sixth - the reserve. The attack was not successful. The Red shock fire brigade attacked, according to some reports, in red shirts, and during the assault they lost half of their men.

The Turkish Wall was occupied only by two Kornilov shock regiments (1000 bayonets), and the third regiment stood with the front to the east, to Syvash, to guard against a flanking maneuver. The Kornilov division had just entered this line of defense, having replaced 2AK units. Being under artillery fire behind the crest of the rampart, which saved the personnel from losses, at the beginning of the attack, the Kornilovites returned to the trenches and shot the attacking enemy from point-blank with machine guns. The Red Army soldiers were only able to reach the ditch braided with barbed wire in front of the rampart and lay down "under the destructive machine-gun and artillery fire", having suffered losses of more than 50%. As Soviet historians, such as Vladimir Triandafillov, later admitted, the attack on the Turkish Wall that day ended in complete failure.

On the other side of the trenches, during the battle on 8 November 1920, the 2nd Kornilov shock regiment, for example, saw 8 people killed and 40 wounded. 35 horses were killed. All wounds were from artillery fire.

On the morning of 8 November, units of the red landing launched an offensive from the Chukhonsky Peninsula to the town of Armyansk, in the rear of the defense of the Turkish Wall. But they could not advance further to Perekop due to a lack of cavalry.

The Drozdov division from Armyansk and the Markov division from Yushun counterattacked, trying to isolate and defeat the red landing, but to no avail. The red units initially retreated, but, having overwhelming superiority, again continued their offensive in the rear of the Perekop positions.

On 9 November 1920, under the threat of encirclement, the Kornilov Shock Division left the Turkish Wall by one in the morning and retreated to their positions at Yushun. The night was dark and starless. In the rearguard of the division, the battalion of Colonel Troshin was left, which by one o'clock also left the Turkish Wall. 

But, according to Soviet historiography, at 03:30 on 9 November 1920, with a repeated attack, simultaneously with a flanking maneuver, the 51st Rifle Division captured the positions at Perekop and continued the attack on the positions at Yushun. Other historians admit that the withdrawal of the White units was only discovered by the Red units on the morning of 9 November.

Assault on the Yushun positions
A change in the direction of the wind caused an increase in the water level in the Syvash, which threatened cutting off the troops on the Lithuanian Peninsula from the main forces of the Red Army.

By 15:00 on 9 November, the red units reached the positions at Yushun. There are several lakes in this place, and therefore the fighting began in narrow defiles between them. All attacks by the Red Army that day were repulsed.

On 10 November, the 15th and 52nd divisions of the Red Army broke through the first line of defensive positions, but were counterattacked and thrown back almost to the Lithuanian Peninsula, and the numerous 51st division, reinforced by the Latvian division, held their positions. By evening, a paradoxical situation had developed, when the opponents on the left flanks mutually threatened each other with encirclement.

General Wrangel had already given the order to evacuate, but the cavalry was thrown into battle so that the infantry units could retreat.

The White Cavalry managed to push back the 15th and 52nd divisions of the Reds from Yushun to the Lithuanian Peninsula, defeat the 7th and 16th cavalry divisions, threatening the rear of the troops that had broken through Perekop.

But Barbovich’s cavalry ran into the Makhnovist cavalry group, which, imitating a retreat, deployed a line of tachanki with 150 machine guns in front of the advancing White cavalry and mowed them down, forcing them to turn back. After that, the Makhnovist cavalrymen and the 2nd Cavalry Army began to cut down the retreating Whites. At the same time, on the opposite sector of the front (near the Karkinit Bay of the Black Sea), the 51st division was able to capture two lines of trenches at Yushun.

On 11 November, the attacks of the red units continued and were finally able to break through the entire line of the Yushun fortifications. The entrance to Crimea was open. On the same day, the Chongar fortifications were also broken through by the red units.

Persecution and occupation of the cities of Crimea

By 12 November 1920, the Red Army had captured Yushun, forcing the white troops into a retreat. Mikhail Frunze gave his troops a day’s notice (to put their units in order) and sent a telegram to Pyotr Wrangel suggesting that he capitulate, but no answer was received. White troops hastily retreated to the ports (Yevpatoriya, Sevastopol, Yalta, Feodosiya and Kerch), where they were loaded onto ships for evacuation. Unlike the disastrous evacuations of Odesa and Novorossiysk, it was planned and carried out in a relatively organized manner.

Some generals and politicians offered to give the last battle to the Red Army, but Alexander Kutepov responded with a short answer: "Putting the army in the field is not a tricky business".

On 13 November the Red Army occupied Simferopol. By 15 November, the Red Army had also occupied Sevastopol and Feodosiya. The White Guards were able to break away from the Red Army and boarding the evacuation ships took place without shelling. When the last ships had already moved away from the moorings, suddenly one destroyer rushed back to the port - they had forgotten the battalion of the Markov regiment guarding the port. They quickly landed it, and the ship returned to the squadron. On 16 November, the Red Army occupied Kerch and, on 17 November, it occupied Yalta.

The result of the Perekop-Chongar operation was the breakthrough of the Red Army into the territory of Crimea, the evacuation of the Russian Army and part of the civilian population abroad, and the establishment of Soviet power in Crimea. The last major front of the Civil War was liquidated. Soviet historiography recognized that the victory in this operation was achieved due to the concentration of superior forces and means on the main directions of the offensive.

In popular culture
Two Comrades Were Serving - 1968 Soviet film, which takes place during the Perekop-Chongar Operation.
Marshal of the Revolution - 1978 Soviet biopic about the Southern Front commander Mikhail Frunze, covering the events from 21 September to 16 November 1920 (the fighting in the south of the left-bank Ukraine, assault of Perekop and forcing the Syvash, the defeat of Baron Wrangel's army in Crimea).
The Sun of the Dead - 1923 novel by Ivan Shmelyov focusing on the consequences of the capture of Crimea by the Red Army.
Sumy Hussars 1651–1951 (Buenos Aires, 1954), a historical overview written by White émigrés, describes the collapse of the 1st Sumy Hussar Regiment's main squadron restored in the Volunteer Army. On  1920, the squadron's remnants surrendered to the Bolsheviks near the village of Mamut. A part of the regiment officers committed suicide, others were shot on the spot.

References

Bibliography
 
 
 
 
 
 
 
 
 
 
 
 

Conflicts in 1920
1920 in Russia
Battles of the Russian Civil War
Crimea during the Russian Civil War
November 1920 events
Perekop (1920)